Licinio or Licínio is both a surname and a given name. Notable people with the name include:

 Surname
Bernardino Licinio (1489–1565), Italian High Renaissance painter of Venice and Lombardy
Giovanni Antonio Licinio the younger (1515–76), Italian painter
Giulio Licinio (16th century), Italian painter of the Renaissance period
Julio Licinio (born before 1982), Brazilian-born physician-investigator in Canberra, Australia
 Given name
Licínio Pereira da Silva (before 1973 – 2008), Portuguese political prisoner
Licínio Rangel (1936–2002), bishop of the Catholic Church from Campos, Brazil
Licinio Refice (1883–1954), Italian composer and priest

See also 
 Licínio de Almeida, a municipality in the state of Bahia in the North-East region of Brazil
 Licinius, (–325), Roman emperor
 

Surnames of Italian origin